Bartolomeo Ghetti may refer to:

 Bartolomeo Ghetti (painter) (died 1536), Florentine Renaissance painter
 Bartolomeo Ghetti (sculptor) (died 1708), Italian sculptor